, better known as , is a fictional character in SNK's Fatal Fury and The King of Fighters series. She made her first appearance in Fatal Fury 3: Road to the Final Victory which introduced her as a special agent who investigates two criminals known as the Jin Brothers while also meeting Terry Bogard, becoming a love interest to him. She then later joins the cast of The King of Fighters starting with The King of Fighters '97, and has appeared in several consecutive games while changing teams over time. Blue Mary has also appeared in the twenty-minute featurette Memories of Stray Wolves took place before the event of Fatal Fury series' last mainline game, Garou Mark of the Wolves.

Android 18, a character from the Dragon Ball manga was Blue Mary's model during development of the series. Her appearances in The King of Fighters owe to popularity polls developed by three video game journals, with Mary being first in Gamest'''s poll allowed to her to become playable for The King of Fighters '97 and subsequent installments. Video game publications have commented on Blue Mary's character, praising her introduction in Fatal Fury 3 and her development through various games.

Character design
Blue Mary's original visual inspiration was Android 18, a character from Akira Toriyama's manga series Dragon Ball. Blue Mary is noted for having short blonde hair in a bob cut, blue eyes, and a muscular body. In Fatal Fury 3, Real Bout Fatal Fury and several other games, Mary wears a small sleeveless red crop top, loose blue jeans with the sign of a star and brown boots. She also wears a brown belt around the jeans (which is noted to become longer in following games), blue fingerless gloves and a green leather jacket that she takes off before fighting. From Fatal Fury 3 to  Real Bout Fatal Fury, she wore light blue wristbands instead of gloves. In Real Bout Fatal Fury Special Mary now wears her jacket in battles and has her top replaced with a blue brassiere. In contrast to this, her "EX" form - as well as her character in the PlayStation version of this game - has the same appearance, but with the jacket red and a black brassiere. Although Blue Mary had this new look, for KOF her designer wanted to use the original Fatal Fury 3 design as he liked it more. However, she appears in KOF: Maximum Impact Regulation A with her Real Bout Fatal Fury Special design. Although Mary does not appear in the final Fatal Fury game, Garou: Mark of the Wolves (set ten years after Real Bout Fatal Fury), she appears in the game's accompanying short, Memories of Stray Wolves. In the featurette, Mary now has longer hair and wears a red and white jacket with the number "8" on each arm. She also sports a white blouse under the jacket and now has brown jeans, black gloves and shoes.

Blue Mary was a challenge to design as a result of how complex her grapple moves are to animate. During her debut in Fatal Fury 3, not many people on the team knew much information about her fighting style, sambo. At one point, one of the designers working on Blue Mary, Youichiro Soeda, used director Yasuyuki Oda as a training dummy to show off some of the attacks he had in mind to the rest of the team. Oda joked that he suffered major wounds after being used by the character designer. In the making of The King of Fighters XIV, the staff felt that the 3D engine gave them more freedom with the character's moves as they were able to perform flashier techniques.

Attributes
On her 20th birthday, she was introduced to her father's Secret Service partner Butch, who gave her the leather jacket she wears as a birthday present. Mary and Butch began dating, and Butch began training her in Combat Sambo. However, Butch and Mary's father were one day assigned to guard the President during a parade. After the parade was over, a group of assassins tried to kill the President, and both men, Mary's father and Butch, lost their lives protecting him. After that Mary became a regular customer in a bar to take her mind out of her sorrow. The bartender of the place created an original blue cocktail named after her. Later she begins to travel the world, and, while on a case, meets Terry Bogard, to whom she grows close as they join forces. She has a pet dog named Anton which normally accompanies her to wherever she has a fight. Blue Mary is very friendly towards everyone, but she knows that her job must come first before anything else. The fighting art she employs, combat sambo, uses striking and grappling techniques.

Appearances

In the Fatal Fury series, Blue Mary has different assignments as an agent which take her to confront criminals from the city of Southtown. She makes her first appearance in Fatal Fury 3: Road to the Final Victory, investigating the Secret Scrolls of the Jin Brothers, items able to give immortality to their users. Real Bout Fatal Fury shows Mary allying with Terry Bogard and his friends to fight the crime lord from Southtown Geese Howard. The two following games, Real Bout Fatal Fury Special and Real Bout Fatal Fury 2: The Newcomers, also feature Blue Mary as a playable character but neither of them presents a storyline. Real Bout Fatal Fury Special also features an "EX" version from Mary with her movesets from Fatal Fury 3. The PlayStation version of Real Bout Fatal Fury Special also contains a music video clip featuring the song "Blue Mary's Blues" by Harumi Ikoma, Mary's voice actress.

Following her Fatal Fury inception, Blue Mary becomes a regular character with frequently changing team membership in The King of Fighters series, beginning as a member of the '97 Special Team in The King of Fighters '97 along with Billy Kane and Ryuji Yamazaki. A mysterious benefactor (Geese Howard) requests her services to enter the King of Fighters tournament, along with Billy and Yamazaki, who starts to become insane due to the power from the demon Orochi. However, after discovering that Geese was her client, Mary leaves the team. The team is also featured in The King of Fighters '98, The King of Fighters 2002, and The King of Fighters Neowave, which do not contain a storyline. In The King of Fighters '99, she joins up with King, Li Xiangfei, and Kasumi Todoh as the new Women Fighters Team, but leaves and becomes the fourth member of the Fatal Fury Team (composed by Terry, Andy Bogard and Joe Higashi) in The King of Fighters 2000 and The King of Fighters 2001. She would join forces with King again as member of the Women Fighters Team in The King of Fighters 2003, this time with Mai Shiranui as their third member. In The King of Fighters XI, she joins Vanessa and Ramón as a member of the Agents Team in order investigate the host from The King of Fighters tournaments, an organization named Those from the Past. Blue Mary appears in The King of Fighters XIV as a playable character via downloadable content. She also appears in the 3D game KOF: Maximum Impact Regulation A, which does not feature official teams. In the spin-off game The King of Fighters: Kyo, Blue Mary appears investigating the actions from Geese along with Kyo Kusanagi and King. In Nintendo's Super Smash Bros. Ultimate, she appears as a background character.

Blue Mary also makes an appearance in the Memories of Stray Wolves twenty-minute featurette that serves as a retrospective of the Fatal Fury series, with Terry narrating the events of the games ten years after Real Bout Fatal Fury. She also stars in manhua based on the games retelling her actions in the series.

Reception
Blue Mary has been well received by gamers, having appeared in several popularity polls from video game journals. In the character popularity poll on Neo Geo Freak's website, her character was voted as the fifteenth favorite with a total of 857 votes. To decide what character should appear in The King of Fighters '97 as part of the Special Team, three video game journals: Gamest, Famitsu and Neo Geo Freak also made popularity polls. Blue Mary was first in the poll from Gamest. For the special endings in The King of Fighters '97, the three journals had to create a team composed of three characters from the game so that they would be featured in an image after completion of the Arcade Mode; the Gamest employees created a team composed of Terry Bogard, Blue Mary and Joe. This special ending only appears in Japanese versions of the game. A sign of her popularity was the Blue Mary action figure released by SNK Playmore, depicted in her original outfit.

The character of Blue Mary has received praise and criticism from video game publications, regarding her fighting style and traits. While Major Mike of GamePro said that she was "limited by uninteresting attacks", the Axe Grinder, reviewing a different version of Fatal Fury 3 for the same publication, counted her among the new characters who had interesting moves. Danyon Carpenter of Electronic Gaming Monthly went farther, citing her as the best of the "really cool" characters introduced in Fatal Fury 3. Kurt Kalata from Armchairempire.com commented that Mary was one of the best new characters from Fatal Fury 3, noting her to be a good replacement for the characters who were removed from the game. Major Mike of GamePro deemed it a major improvement over Fatal Fury 3: Road to the Final Victory, citing the greater effectiveness of Mary over her original incarnation. GameZone's Eduardo Zacarias noted Mary to be similar to other female assassins from video games such as Tekken's Nina Williams or Christie from Dead or Alive. Nick Valentino from the same website praised Mary's development in the Real Bout Fatal Fury games as her techniques became more straightforward, relying now more on strength. Blue Mary's voice actress Harumi Ikoma was criticized for her role with Mary in the first game she appeared by Robert Workman from GameDaily, who stated that "Blue Mary should take a few vocal lessons and work on that high-pitched squeak of hers". Den of Geek listed her as the 45th best The King of Fighters character with the writing favorably comparing her with Mai Shiranui based on her relationship with Terry but criticizing her detective skills. Her inclusion in KOF XIV'' was noted by Yasuyuki Oda done as a result of multiple fan requests.

References

Fatal Fury characters
Female characters in video games
Fictional American people in video games
Fictional martial artists in video games
Fictional sambo practitioners
Fictional secret agents and spies in video games
SNK protagonists
The King of Fighters characters
Woman soldier and warrior characters in video games
Video game characters introduced in 1995